The Violet class destroyer was a class of two destroyers that served in the British Royal Navy. 

They were fitted with Thornycroft boilers which generated 6,300 HP and produced the  demanded of these three funnelled C-class destroyers. They were armed with the standard 12-pounder gun and two torpedo tubes, and carried a complement of 63 officers and men.  

Both ships served through the Great War and were broken up shortly afterwards.

References

Destroyer classes
Ship classes of the Royal Navy